Oscar Martínez (born 1889, date of death unknown) was an Argentine fencer. He competed in the individual épée event at the 1928 Summer Olympics.

References

1889 births
Year of death missing
Argentine male fencers
Argentine épée fencers
Olympic fencers of Argentina
Fencers at the 1928 Summer Olympics
20th-century Argentine people